David Wade Ratliff (20 April 1912 – 21 March 1995) was an American politician from Texas. A Democrat who lived in Stamford, Texas, he served his first term in the Texas House of Representatives as a legislator from District 115. In his second term as state representative, Ratliff held the District 85 seat. After the death of state senator Harley Sadler, Ratliff won a December 1954 special election to replace him in District 24, and was succeeded as a state representative by Moyne Kelly. Ratliff retained the Texas Senate's District 24 seat until resigning the position on 26 April 1972. Bill Tippen won a special election in June, and completed Ratliff's term in office.

References

People from Stamford, Texas
Democratic Party Texas state senators
Democratic Party members of the Texas House of Representatives
1912 births
1995 deaths
20th-century American politicians